James Danforth Quayle (born February 4, 1947) is an American politician who served as the 44th vice president of the United States from 1989 to 1993 under President George H. W. Bush. A member of the Republican Party, Quayle previously represented Indiana in the House of Representatives from 1977 to 1981 and in the Senate from 1981 to 1989.

A native of Indianapolis, Quayle spent most of his childhood in Paradise Valley, a suburb of Phoenix, Arizona. He married Marilyn Tucker in 1972 and obtained his J.D. degree from the Indiana University Robert H. McKinney School of Law in 1974. He and Marilyn practiced law in Huntington, Indiana, before his election to the United States House of Representatives in 1976. In 1980, he was elected to the U.S. Senate.

In 1988, vice president and Republican presidential nominee George H. W. Bush chose Quayle as his running mate. His vice presidential debate against Lloyd Bentsen was notable for the "Senator, you're no Jack Kennedy" quip. The Bush–Quayle ticket defeated the Democratic ticket of Michael Dukakis and Bentsen, and Quayle became vice president in January 1989. During his tenure, Quayle made official visits to 47 countries and was appointed chairman of the National Space Council. As vice president, he developed a reputation for making gaffes. He secured re-nomination for vice president in 1992, but Democrat Bill Clinton and his running mate Al Gore defeated the Bush–Quayle ticket.

In 1994, Quayle published his memoir, Standing Firm. He declined to run for president in 1996 because of phlebitis. He sought the Republican presidential nomination in 2000, but withdrew his campaign early on and supported the eventual nominee, George W. Bush. He joined Cerberus Capital Management, a private equity firm, in 1999. Since leaving office, Quayle has remained active in the Republican Party, including making several presidential endorsements in 2000, 2012, and 2016.

Early life, education, and career

Quayle was born in Indianapolis, Indiana, to Martha Corinne (née Pulliam) and James Cline Quayle. He has sometimes been incorrectly referred to as James Danforth Quayle III. In his memoir he points out that his birth name was simply James Danforth Quayle. The name Quayle originates from the Isle of Man, where his great-grandfather was born.

His maternal grandfather, Eugene C. Pulliam, was a wealthy and influential publishing magnate who founded Central Newspapers, Inc., and owned more than a dozen major newspapers, such as The Arizona Republic and The Indianapolis Star. James C. Quayle moved his family to Arizona in 1955 to run a branch of the family's publishing empire.

After spending much of his youth in Arizona, Quayle returned to his native Indiana and graduated from Huntington North High School in Huntington in 1965. He then matriculated at DePauw University, where he received his B.A. degree in political science in 1969, was a 3-year letterman for the university's golf team (1967–69) and a member of the fraternity Delta Kappa Epsilon (Psi Phi chapter).

After graduation, Quayle joined the Indiana National Guard and served from 1969 to 1975, reaching the rank of sergeant; his joining meant that he was not subject to the draft. In 1970, while serving in the Guard, Quayle enrolled at Indiana University Robert H. McKinney School of Law. He was admitted under a program for students who could demonstrate "special factors" as his grades did not meet the regular admission standards. In 1974, Quayle earned a Juris Doctor (J.D.) degree. At Indiana University, he met his future wife, Marilyn, who was taking night classes at the same law school at the time.

Quayle became an investigator for the Consumer Protection Division of the Office of the Indiana Attorney General in July 1971. Later that year, he became an administrative assistant to Governor Edgar Whitcomb. From 1973 to 1974, he was the Director of the Inheritance Tax Division of the Indiana Department of Revenue. After graduating from law school in 1974, Quayle worked as associate publisher of his family's newspaper, the Huntington Herald-Press.

Congressional tenure

In 1976, Quayle was elected to the House of Representatives from Indiana's 4th congressional district, defeating eight-term incumbent Democrat J. Edward Roush by a 55%-to-45% margin. He was reelected in 1978, 64% to 34%.

In November 1978, Congressman Leo Ryan of California invited Quayle to accompany him on a delegation to investigate unsafe conditions at the Jonestown settlement in Guyana, but Quayle was unable to participate. The decision likely saved Quayle's life, because Ryan and his entourage were subsequently murdered at the airstrip in Jonestown as the party tried to escape the massacre.

In 1980, at age 33, Quayle became the youngest person ever elected to the Senate from the state of Indiana, defeating three-term incumbent Democrat Birch Bayh with 54% of the vote. Making Indiana political history again, Quayle was reelected to the Senate in 1986 with the largest margin ever achieved to that date by a candidate in a statewide Indiana race, taking 61% of the vote against his Democratic opponent, Jill Long.

In 1986, Quayle was criticized for championing the cause of Daniel Anthony Manion, a candidate for a federal appellate judgeship, who was in law school one year ahead of Quayle. The American Bar Association had evaluated Manion as "qualified/unqualified", its lower passing grade. Manion was nominated for the Seventh Circuit of the U.S. Court of Appeals by President Ronald Reagan on February 21, 1986, and confirmed by the Senate on June 26, 1986.

Vice presidency (1989–1993)

1988 campaign
On August 16, 1988, at the Republican convention in New Orleans, Louisiana, George H. W. Bush chose Quayle to be his running mate in the 1988 United States presidential election. The choice immediately became controversial. Outgoing President Reagan praised Quayle for his "energy and enthusiasm". Press coverage of the convention was dominated by questions about "the three Quayle problems". The questions involved his military service, a golf holiday in Florida where he and several other politicians shared a house with lobbyist Paula Parkinson, and whether he had enough experience to be vice president. Quayle seemed at times rattled and at other times uncertain or evasive as he responded to questions. Delegates to the convention generally blamed television and newspapers for the focus on Quayle's problems, but Bush's staff said they thought Quayle had mishandled the questions about his military record, leaving questions dangling. Although Bush was trailing by up to 15 points in public opinion polls taken before the convention, in August the Bush–Quayle ticket took the lead, which it did not relinquish for the rest of the campaign.

In the October 1988 vice-presidential debate, Quayle debated Democratic candidate Lloyd Bentsen. During the debate, Quayle's strategy was to criticize Dukakis as too liberal. When the debate turned to Quayle's relatively limited experience in public life, he compared the length of his congressional service (12 years) with that of President John F. Kennedy (14 years); Kennedy had less experience than his rivals during the 1960 presidential nomination. It was a factual comparison, although Quayle's advisers cautioned beforehand that it could be used against him. Bentsen's response—"I served with Jack Kennedy. I knew Jack Kennedy. Jack Kennedy was a friend of mine. Senator, you're no Jack Kennedy"—subsequently became a part of the political lexicon.

The Bush–Quayle ticket won the November election by a 53–46 percent margin, sweeping 40 states and capturing 426 electoral votes. He was sworn in on January 20, 1989. Quayle cast no tie-breaking votes as president of the Senate, becoming only the second vice-president (after Charles W. Fairbanks) not to do so while serving a complete term.

Tenure
During his vice presidency, Quayle made official trips to 47 countries. Bush named Quayle head of the Council on Competitiveness and the first chairman of the National Space Council. As head of the NSC he called for greater efforts to protect Earth against the danger of potential asteroid impacts.

After a briefing by Lt. General Daniel O. Graham, (USA Ret.), Max Hunter, and Jerry Pournelle, Quayle sponsored the development of an experimental Single Stage to Orbit X-Program, which resulted in the building of the McDonnell Douglas DC-X.

Quayle has since described the vice presidency as "an awkward office. You're president of the Senate. You're not even officially part of the executive branch—you're part of the legislative branch. You're paid by the Senate, not by the executive branch. And it's the president's agenda. It's not your agenda. You're going to disagree from time to time, but you salute and carry out the orders the best you can".

Murphy Brown
On May 19, 1992, Quayle gave a speech titled Reflections on Urban America to the Commonwealth Club of California on the subject of the Los Angeles riots. In the speech he blamed the violence on a decay of moral values and family structure in American society. In an aside, he cited the single mother title character in the television program Murphy Brown as an example of how popular culture contributes to this "poverty of values", saying, "It doesn't help matters when prime-time TV has Murphy Brown—a character who supposedly epitomizes today's intelligent, highly paid, professional woman—mocking the importance of fathers, by bearing a child alone, and calling it just another 'lifestyle choice'."

The "Murphy Brown speech" became one of the most memorable of the 1992 campaign. Long after the outcry had ended, the comment continued to have an effect on U.S. politics. Stephanie Coontz, a professor of family history and the author of several books and essays about the history of marriage, said that this brief remark by Quayle about Murphy Brown "kicked off more than a decade of outcries against the 'collapse of the family. In 2002, Candice Bergen, the actress who played Brown, said "I never have really said much about the whole episode, which was endless, but his speech was a perfectly intelligent speech about fathers not being dispensable and nobody agreed with that more than I did." Others interpreted it differently; singer Tanya Tucker was widely quoted as saying "Who the hell is Dan Quayle to come after single mothers?"

Gaffes
Throughout his time as vice president, Quayle was widely ridiculed in the media and by many in the general public, both in the U.S. and overseas, as an intellectual lightweight and an incompetent individual. Contributing greatly to the perception of Quayle's incompetence was his tendency to make public statements that were either impossible ("I have made good judgments in the past. I have made good judgments in the future"), self-contradictory ("I believe we are on an irreversible trend toward more freedom and democracy, but that could change"), self-contradictory and confused ("The Holocaust was an obscene period in our nation's history. ... No, not our nation's, but in World War II. I mean, we all lived in this century. I didn't live in this century, but in this century's history"), or just confused (such as the comments he made in a May 1989 address to the United Negro College Fund (UNCF). Commenting on the UNCF's slogan—which is "a mind is a terrible thing to waste"—Quayle said, "You take the UNCF model that what a waste it is to lose one's mind or not to have a mind is being very wasteful. How true that is").

On June 15, 1992, Quayle altered 12-year-old student William Figueroa's correct spelling of "potato" to "potatoe" at the Muñoz Rivera Elementary School spelling bee in Trenton, New Jersey. He was the subject of widespread ridicule for his error. According to The New York Times and Quayle's memoirs, he was relying on cards provided by the school, which Quayle says included the misspelling. Quayle said he was uncomfortable with the version he gave, but did so because he decided to trust the school's incorrect written materials instead of his own judgment.

1992 campaign

In the 1992 election, Bush and Quayle were challenged in their bid for reelection by the Democratic ticket of Arkansas Governor Bill Clinton and Tennessee Senator Al Gore and the independent ticket of Texas businessman Ross Perot and retired Vice Admiral James Stockdale.

As Bush lagged in the polls in the weeks preceding the August 1992 Republican National Convention, some Republican strategists (led by Secretary of State James Baker) viewed Quayle as a liability to the ticket and pushed for his replacement. Quayle ultimately survived the challenge and secured renomination.

During the 1992 presidential campaign, Quayle told the news media that he believed homosexuality was a choice, and "the wrong choice".

Quayle faced off against Gore and Stockdale in the vice presidential debate on October 13, 1992. He attempted to avoid the one-sided outcome of his debate with Bentsen four years earlier by staying on the offensive. Quayle criticized Gore's book Earth in the Balance with specific page references, though his claims were subsequently criticized by the liberal group FAIR for inaccuracy. In Quayle's closing argument, he sharply asked voters, "Do you really believe Bill Clinton will tell the truth?" and "Do you trust Bill Clinton to be your president?" Gore and Stockdale talked more about the policies and philosophies they espoused. Republican loyalists were largely relieved and pleased with Quayle's performance, and his camp attempted to portray it as an upset triumph against a veteran debater, but post-debate polls were mixed on whether Gore or Quayle had won. It ultimately proved to be a minor factor in the election, which Bush and Quayle lost, 168 electoral votes to 370.

Post–vice presidency (1993–present)

Initial activities
In 1993, Quayle became the trustee of the Hudson Institute. From 1993 to January 1999, he served on the board of Central Newspapers, Inc., and from 1995 until January 1999, he headed the Campaign America political action committee.

Quayle authored a 1994 memoir, Standing Firm, which became a bestseller. Quayle's second book, The American Family: Discovering the Values That Make Us Strong, was co-authored with Diane Medved and published in 1996. He later published his third book Worth Fighting For, in 1999.

Quayle moved to Arizona in 1996. He considered but decided against running for governor of Indiana in 1996, and decided against running for the 1996 Republican presidential nomination, citing health problems related to phlebitis.

In 1997 and 1998, Quayle was a "distinguished visiting professor of international studies" at the Thunderbird School of Global Management.

2000 presidential campaign

During a January 1999 appearance on Larry King Live, Quayle said he would run for president in 2000. On January 28, 1999, he officially created an exploratory committee. On April 14, 1999, at a rally held at his alma mater Huntington North High School's gymnasium, Quayle officially launched his campaign for the 2000 Republican presidential nomination. In July 1999, he published his book Worth Fighting For.

During campaign appearances, Quayle criticized fellow candidate George W. Bush. Early on, he criticized Bush's use of the term "compassionate conservative". 

Quayle finished eighth in the August 1999 Ames Straw Poll. He withdrew from the race the next month and supported Bush.

Subsequent activities
Quayle, then working as an investment banker in Phoenix, was mentioned as a candidate for governor of Arizona before the 2002 election, but declined to run.

On January 31, 2011, Quayle wrote a letter to President Barack Obama urging him to commute Jonathan Pollard's sentence.

In December 2011, Quayle endorsed Mitt Romney for the 2012 Republican presidential nomination.

In the 2016 presidential election, Quayle endorsed Jeb Bush. After Bush failed to win the nomination, Quayle endorsed Donald Trump; he was later seen visiting with Trump at Trump Tower in Manhattan before Trump's inauguration.

The Dan Quayle Center and Museum, in Huntington, Indiana, features information on Quayle and all U.S. vice presidents.

Quayle is an Honorary Trustee Emeritus of the Hudson Institute and president of Quayle and Associates. He has also been a member of the board of directors of Heckmann Corporation, a water-sector company, since the company's inception and serves as chair of the company's Compensation and Nominating & Governance Committees. Quayle is a director of Aozora Bank, based in Tokyo, Japan. He has also been on the boards of directors of other companies, including K2 Sports, AmTran Inc., Central Newspapers Inc., BTC Inc. and Carvana Co.

According to the book Peril, by Bob Woodward and Robert Costa, Quayle played a central role in advising Vice President Mike Pence to certify the 2020 United States presidential election as per the Senate rules. Quayle attended President Joe Biden's inauguration on January 20, 2021.

Cerberus Capital Management
In 1999, Quayle joined Cerberus Capital Management, a multibillion-dollar private-equity firm, where he serves as chair of the company's Global Investments division. As chair of the international advisory board of Cerberus Capital Management, he recruited former Canadian prime minister Brian Mulroney, who would have been installed as chair if Cerberus had acquired Air Canada.

In early 2014, Quayle traveled to Belfast, Northern Ireland, in an attempt to speed approval for a deal in which Cerberus acquired nearly £1.3 billion in Northern Ireland loans from the Republic of Ireland's National Asset Management Agency. The Irish government is investigating the deal, and the US Securities and Exchange Commission, the Federal Bureau of Investigation, and the United States Attorney for the Southern District of New York are investigating Quayle's involvement as a potentially "very serious" misuse of the vice president's office. As of December 2018, Quayle served as chair of Global Investments at Cerberus.

Personal life

Quayle lives with his wife, Marilyn Quayle, in Paradise Valley, Arizona. They married in November 1972 and have three children: Tucker, Benjamin, and Corinne. Benjamin Quayle served in the U.S. House of Representatives from 2011 to 2013, representing Arizona's 3rd congressional district.

Electoral history

Published material
 Standing Firm: A Vice-Presidential Memoir, HarperCollins, May 1994. hardcover, ; mass market paperback, May 1995; ; Limited edition, 1994, 
 The American Family: Discovering the Values That Make Us Strong (with Diane Medved), Harpercollins, April 1996,  (hardcover),  (paperback)
 Worth Fighting For, W Publishing Group, July 1999,

See also

Footnotes

Further reading
 Richard F. Fenno Jr., The Making of a Senator: Dan Quayle, Congressional Quarterly Press, 1989. . online free to borrow
 What a Waste It Is to Lose One's Mind: The Unauthorized Autobiography of Dan Quayle, Quayle Quarterly (published by Rose Communications), April 1992, .
 Joe Queenan, Imperial Caddy: The Rise of Dan Quayle in America and the Decline and Fall of Practically Everything Else, Hyperion Books; October 1992 (1st edition). .

External links

 
 
 Campaign contributions made by Dan Quayle
 "Reflections on Urban America" speech to the Commonwealth Club of California ("Murphy Brown speech"): Transcript, Audio
 List of Quayle quotations
 Another list of Quayle quotations
 Vice Presidential Museum at the Dan Quayle Center
 VP Quayle Receives DePauw's McNaughton Medal for Public Service; October 26, 1990
 Genealogy of the family of J. Danforth Quayle
 Ubben Lecture at DePauw University; March 31, 2015

|-

|-

|-

|-

|-

 
1947 births
1988 United States vice-presidential candidates
1992 United States vice-presidential candidates
20th-century vice presidents of the United States
20th-century American writers
20th-century American memoirists
American people of Manx descent
Presbyterian Church in America members
Arizona Republicans
Candidates in the 2000 United States presidential election
Cerberus Capital Management
Christians from Arizona
Christians from Indiana
DePauw Tigers men's golfers
George H. W. Bush administration cabinet members
Indiana lawyers
Indiana National Guard personnel
Indiana University Robert H. McKinney School of Law alumni
Living people
People from Huntington, Indiana
People from Paradise Valley, Arizona
Politicians from Indianapolis
Pulliam family
Quayle family
Republican Party (United States) vice presidential nominees
Republican Party United States senators from Indiana
Republican Party vice presidents of the United States
United States Army soldiers
Vice presidents of the United States
Writers from Arizona
Writers from Indianapolis
Republican Party members of the United States House of Representatives from Indiana